David Nalbandian was the defending champion, but chose not to participate this year.

In the final, Marcos Baghdatis defeated Richard Gasquet, 6–4, 7–6(2).

It was his first maiden ATP Tour title.

Seeds
The top four seeds receive a bye to the second round.

Draw

Finals

Top half

Bottom half

Qualifying draw

Seeds

Qualifiers

Lucky loser

First qualifier

Second qualifier

Third qualifier

Fourth qualifier

External links
 Main Draw
Qualifying Draw

M